Coleophora obtectella is a moth of the family Coleophoridae. It is found from Austria to Spain, Sicily and Crete and from France to Bulgaria.

The larvae feed on Satureja cuneifolia, Satureja montana and Thymus serpyllum. They create a spatulate leaf case of about 8 mm long when living on Satureja. When it lives on Thymus, it makes a composite leaf case out of three or four leaflets. The rear end is bivalved and the mouth angle is about 45°. Larvae can be found from autumn to June.

References

obtectella
Moths described in 1849
Moths of Europe